This is a list of members of the Walloon Parliament between 2004 and 2009.

List of members

References

Sources
  
 

List of Members of the Walloon Parliament
Walloon Parliament
2000s in Belgium